You'll Be in My Heart (German: Mein Herz gehört Dir...) is a 1930 German drama film directed by Max Reichmann and starring Camilla Horn, Fritz Schulz and Victor Varconi.

The film's sets were designed by the art director Hans Jacoby.

Cast
 Camilla Horn as Diane D'Artois 
 Fritz Schulz as Tjurkod 
 Victor Varconi
 Werner Fuetterer as Marquis Duverge 
 Olga Limburg as seine Tochter 
 Raimondo Van Riel as Krassow 
 Yvette Darnys as Yvonne Dupon 
 Alexander Murski

References

Bibliography
 Bock, Hans-Michael & Bergfelder, Tim. The Concise CineGraph. Encyclopedia of German Cinema. Berghahn Books, 2009.

External links

1930 films
1930 drama films
German drama films
Films of the Weimar Republic
1930s German-language films
Films directed by Max Reichmann
National Film films
German black-and-white films
1930s German films